The Glasgow Junior Football League (GJL) was a football league competition operated under the Scottish Junior Football Association between 1895 and 1927. As its name suggests, it was primarily for teams in the Glasgow area, but did include teams from towns outside the city; conversely, other leagues existed concurrently (such as the Scottish Junior Football League) and some teams based in Glasgow played in those.

The league – the champions of which were awarded the Evening Times Trophy – was seen as one of the strongest in Scotland, with its clubs winning or reaching the final of the national knockout competition, the Scottish Junior Cup, several times. Membership varied, with mergers involving other leagues occurring on various occasions and individual teams being enticed to join the GJL from those leagues.

Having continued through World War I, the GJL was dissolved in 1927 when the intermediate dispute occurred; however its members (and other clubs) formed the Scottish Intermediate Football League which was contested for four years. In 1931, the Central Junior Football League was formed, with notes from its 1932 AGM stating that it was the 32nd such meeting, suggesting that it was considered a continuation of the pre-1927 GJL. This setup continued until 1968 when the Central League merged with the long-running Lanarkshire Junior Football League as the Central Region, and eventually 2002 the Ayrshire Junior Football League (many of whose clubs had also been involved in the intermediate dispute of the 1920s, although they played in a separate division) joined to create the Scottish Junior Football Association, West Region.

Two of the clubs who participated in the first season of the Glasgow Junior League in 1895–96 – Maryhill and Vale of Clyde – played in the SJFA West in 2019–20, and others who joined in the 19th century (Ashfield, Glasgow Perthshire, Petershill and Rutherglen Glencairn) also survived into the 21st. At the end of that season – which was curtailed due to the coronavirus pandemic – all 63 West Region clubs left the SJFA setup to join a new West of Scotland Football League in the Senior pyramid, bringing 125 years of Junior league football in the region (including the intermediate years) to an end.

Champions

Key:

List of winners

References

 Scottish Junior FA Structure, Scottish Junior Football Association

1895 establishments in Scotland
1927 disestablishments in Scotland
Sports leagues established in 1895
Sports leagues disestablished in 1927
Defunct Scottish Junior Football Association leagues
Football in Glasgow
Scottish Junior Football Association, West Region
Football in Renfrewshire
Football in West Dunbartonshire
Football in East Dunbartonshire
Football in North Lanarkshire
Football in South Lanarkshire
Football in East Renfrewshire